Cisomang Barat is a village in the district Cikalongwetan

Villages in District Cikalongwetan 
 Cikalong
 Cipada
 Ciptagumati
 Cisomang Barat
 Ganjarsari
 Kanangasari
 Mandalamukti
 Mandalasari
 Mekarjaya
 Puteran
 Rende
 Tenjolaut
 Wangunjaya

Villages in West Java